Aaron Simpson may refer to:

 Aaron Simpson (entrepreneur) (born 1972), British businessman
 Aaron Simpson (fighter) (born 1974), American mixed martial artist
 Aaron Simpson (footballer, born 1997), English footballer
 Aaron Simpson (footballer, born 1999), English footballer
 Aaron Simpson (producer) (born 1971), American television producer